ZOB can refer to:
Jewish Combat Organization
Cleveland Air Route Traffic Control Center
Berlin Zoologischer Garten railway station
 Zentraler Omnibus Bahnhof, a common German abbreviation for a town's main bus station.

See also 
 Zhob, a town and district in Pakistan